Daniel Tucker may refer to:

Daniel Tucker (colonial administrator) (1575–1625), Governor of Bermuda 1616 to 1619
Daniel Tucker (minister) (1740–1818), American Methodist minister, captain in the American Revolution
Dan Tucker (lawman) (born 1849), American lawman and gunfighter
 Daniel Tucker, bassist for the band Obituary (from 1984 to present)
 Daniel Tuckier, inaugural member of the Indigenous Advisory Council in Australia

See also
 "Old Dan Tucker", an 1843 American folk song